Sense and Sensibility is a 1971 BBC television adaptation of Jane Austen's 1811 novel. It was dramatized by Denis Constanduros, and directed by David Giles.

Cast 
 Michael Aldridge – Sir John Middleton (4 episodes, 1971)
 Sheila Ballantine – Lady Middleton (4 episodes, 1971)
 Esme Church – Mary (4 episodes, 1971)
 Joanna David – Elinor Dashwood (4 episodes, 1971)
 Isabel Dean – Mrs. Dashwood (4 episodes, 1971)
 Robin Ellis – Edward Ferrars (4 episodes, 1971)
 Clive Francis – John Willoughby (4 episodes, 1971)
 Ciaran Madden – Marianne Dashwood (4 episodes, 1971)
 Richard Owens – Colonel Brandon (4 episodes, 1971)
 Patricia Routledge – Mrs. Jennings (4 episodes, 1971)
 Jo Kendall – Charlotte Palmer (3 episodes, 1971)
 Peter Laird – Rodgers (3 episodes, 1971)
 David Strong – Palmer (3 episodes, 1971)
 David Belcher – Robert Ferrars (2 episodes, 1971)
 Frances Cuka – Lucy Steele (2 episodes, 1971)
 Mischa De La Motte – Master of Ceremonies / ... (2 episodes, 1971)
 Kay Gallie – Fanny Dashwood (2 episodes, 1971)
 Milton Johns – John Dashwood (2 episodes, 1971)
 Maggie Jones – Nancy Steele (2 episodes, 1971)
 Clifford Parrish – Doctor Harris (2 episodes, 1971)
 Ailsa Grahame – Mrs. Ferrars (1 episode, 1971)

References

External links 

 

1971 British television series debuts
1971 British television series endings
BBC television dramas
Television series based on Sense and Sensibility
Television shows set in England
Costume drama television series
1970s British drama television series
1970s British television miniseries
Television series set in the 19th century
English-language television shows
1970s British romance television series